Carlos Troyer, (January 12, 1837 – July 26, 1920) born Charles Troyer, was an American composer known for his musical arrangements of traditional Native American melodies.

Biography
Born in Frankfurt, Germany, Troyer settled in San Francisco sometime before 1871, where he became known alternatively as a musician, pianist and teacher of music; he began using the name Carlos around 1885. In 1893 he published Two Zuñi Songs, an arrangement of Zuni music. Eventually, his works became further romanticized and ad lib in their style, culminating in his final published piece, Midnight Visit to the Sacred Shrines, a Zuñian Ritual: a Monody for Two Flute-trumpets of High and Low Pitch (Clarinet and Oboe); a Traditional Chant of Melodic Beauty, and Parting Song on Leaving the Shrines, with English and Indian Texts … the Accompaniment may be played on the Piano.

He died in Berkeley, California at the age of 83.

See also
Indianist movement

References 
 Robert Stevenson: 'Carlos Troyer', Grove Music Online ed. L. Macy (Accessed 23 May 2006), <http://www.grovemusic.com>

External links
 
 

1920 deaths
1837 births
American male composers
American composers
Musicians from Frankfurt
Musicians from the San Francisco Bay Area
German emigrants to the United States